"While the Earth Sleeps" is a song written by Eric Mouquet and Michel Sanchez of Deep Forest and Peter Gabriel. The song was performed by Deep Forest with Peter Gabriel and appeared on the soundtrack for the film Strange Days (1995) and is played over the film's end credits. It was released as a CD single. The song features Bulgarian folk singer Katya Petrova.

Samples 
The song incorporates credited samples from "Shashvi, Kakabi", performed by Tsinandali Choir and from "Övgön Chuuvuu" from the album Mongolie, musique vocale et instrumentale. The passage "Dali znaeš, mila majko" ("Do you know, dear mother?") comes from a Bulgarian folk song. However, Risto Puleski from Nižepole, North Macedonia claimed that the lyrics of the song were in the Macedonian language and asserted that it was neither Bulgarian, nor a folk song, but that he had written it in 1960. This claim has never been corroborated and no legal action followed.

Track listing 

Track 2 is featured in the film Strange Days, but not on the soundtrack.

References 

 Bulgarie - Chants et danses album's website
 Original Song by Violeta Tomovska i Kiril Mancevski-Dali Znaes Mila Majko

External links 
 Deep Forest site
 

1995 songs
1995 singles
Deep Forest songs
Peter Gabriel songs
Songs written by Peter Gabriel
Songs written by Michel Sanchez
Columbia Records singles
Songs about sleep